The 2022 Ivy League men's basketball tournament was the postseason men's basketball tournament for the Ivy League of the 2021–22 NCAA Division I men's basketball season. It was held March 12–13, 2022, at the Lavietes Pavilion on the campus of Harvard University in Boston. The tournament champions, the Yale Bulldogs, received the conference's automatic bid to the 2022 NCAA tournament. This marks the first Ivy-league tournament (men's or women's) that was not won by a team that was at least co-regular season champion.

Seeds
The top four teams in the Ivy League regular-season standings qualify for the tournament and are seeded according to their records in conference play, resulting in a Shaughnessy playoff. If a tie for any of the top four positions exists, tiebreakers are applied in the following order:
 Head-to-head record between teams involved in the tie.
 Record against the top team(s) not involved in the tie in order of conference record, going down through the seedings until the tie is broken.
 Average of the teams' ranking in the following computer systems: NCAA NET, Sagarin, KenPom, and ESPN Basketball Percentage Index.

Schedule

Bracket

See also
 2022 Ivy League women's basketball tournament

Footnotes

References

Tournament
Ivy League men's basketball tournament
Basketball competitions in Boston
College sports tournaments in Massachusetts
Ivy League men's basketball tournament
Ivy League men's basketball tournament
Ivy League men's basketball tournament